Martini & Rossi is an Italian multinational alcoholic beverage company primarily associated with the Martini brand of vermouth and also with sparkling wine (for example, Asti). It also produces the French vermouth, Noilly Prat.

History

The company started in the mid-19th century, as a vermouth bottling plant in Pessione – the Distilleria Nazionale di Spirito di Vino. Three men came to dominate the company, businessman Alessandro Martini, winemaker Luigi Rossi and accountant Teofilo Sola. In 1863 they changed the name to Martini, Sola & Cia. The Sola family sold out in 1879, and the company became known as Martini & Rossi.

1892 – The business is taken over by Rossi's four sons.
1929 – The Martini Ball & Bar logo is registered for the first time.
1930 – Rossi's grandsons take over control of the company.
1977 – The company is restructured with the creation of the General Beverage Corporation.
1993 – Martini & Rossi merge with Bacardi.

Motor racing
The company has been involved in motor racing sponsorship under the Martini Racing banner since 1968, and was a minor sponsor of Scuderia Ferrari until 2008. From 2014–2018 Martini was the title sponsor of Williams F1, with the team officially called "Williams Martini Racing", and the car in the traditional Martini racing colors.

Brands

Vermouth
Vermouth is made from wine with added sugar, alcohol and botanicals (herbs and spices).

Martini Rosso – 1863
Martini Bianco – 1910
Martini Extra Dry – This was launched on New Year's Day 1900.
Martini Rosato 
Martini D’Oro – 1998
Martini Fiero
Martini Gold
Martini Royale
Martini Bitter
Noilly Prat, a French vermouth owned by the company

Sparkling wine
Their sparkling wines are all from northern Italy, and are sold under the Martini & Rossi brand:

Martini & Rossi Asti (75cl and blue 25cl bottles) from Piedmont
Martini & Rossi Prosecco (75cl bottles) from Veneto
Martini & Rossi red wine & gin

See also

 List of Italian companies

References

External links 

 

Multinational companies headquartered in Italy
Italian companies established in 1863
Manufacturing companies based in Turin
Wineries of Italy
British Royal Warrant holders
Food and drink companies established in 1863